This is a list of international trips made by Ranil Wickremesinghe as the 9th President of Sri Lanka since 2022.

Summary of International Trips

2022

Scheduled visits

Multilateral meetings participated in by Wickremesinghe

References

External links

Official
 State Visits  – President's Media Division

Presidential Trips
2022 in international relations
Wickremesinghe, Ranil
Wickremesinghe, Ranil